Göran Mattias Marklund (born 2 October 1975 in Stockholm) is a retired Swedish footballer and coach who is currently assistant manager for Assyriska FF in Superettan. He plays as a forward.

References

External links

Fotbolltransfers profile (in Swedish)

Living people
1975 births
Swedish footballers
Swedish football managers
Vasalunds IF players
Dundee United F.C. players
AFC Eskilstuna players
AIK Fotboll players
Assyriska FF players
Scottish Football League players
Superettan players
Allsvenskan players
Assyriska FF managers
Swedish expatriate footballers
Expatriate footballers in Scotland
Swedish expatriate sportspeople in the United Kingdom
Spånga IS players
Association football forwards
Footballers from Stockholm